Geograph Britain and Ireland is a web-based project, begun in March 2005, to create a freely accessible archive of geographically located photographs of Great Britain and Ireland. Photographs in the Geograph collection are chosen to illustrate significant or typical features of each 1 km × 1 km (100 ha) grid square in the Ordnance Survey National Grid and the Irish national grid reference system. There are 332,216 such grid squares containing at least some land or permanent structure (at low tide), of which 280,037 have Geographs.

Geographs are being collected for all parts of Great Britain, Isle of Man and Ireland. The Channel Islands fall outside Britain's grid system, but may be geographed using their local UTM grid.

The project is sponsored by the Ordnance Survey, and extracts from the OS Landranger 1:50,000 scale maps illustrate the grid square pages. Geograph Project Limited is a charity registered in England and Wales, and the name Geograph is trademarked.

Contributions
Photographs can be contributed by any registered user, although they must be approved by a panel of moderators before appearing on the website. The main aim of moderation is to make the site 'classroom ready' so that inappropriate images are rejected. All images are licensed by the contributors using the Creative Commons cc-by-sa 2.0 licence which permits modification and redistribution of the images under certain conditions. Contributors should be aware that they are granting everyone an irrevocable licence to use their image(s); it is very difficult to get an image removed once it appears on the website. Default photo resolution is a 1024 pixels long edge, with a minimum of 640 pixels and options for higher resolutions to be made available.

The entire archive of images with RDF metadata is available for download via BitTorrent.

As an incentive to increase coverage, participants are awarded a point each time they contribute the first photograph classified as a geograph to a grid square. There is, however, no limit to the number of images per square, and some squares have over 1000 images.

Some participants combine geographing with other outdoor location sports such as letterboxing, geocaching, trigpointing, benchmarking, and peak bagging.

Types of image

Geograph images are classified by site moderators as:
 Geograph – an image which usefully illustrates or characterises the area in which it was taken;
 Accepted – an image which adds useful information about a square but which does not meet the requirements of a geograph; this includes close-ups, interiors, aerial shots, photos taken from outside the grid square, moveable objects that can't be shown on maps and silhouetted images; this category has subcategories 'Close Look', 'Inside', 'Aerial', 'Cross Grid' and 'Extra';
 Rejected – an image that does not meet the requirements of the Geograph Project.

There is a special classification of image that is known as a First Geograph – the first image uploaded of a particular grid square which meets the requirements to be a geograph. Contributors can also gain Second, Third and Fourth visitor points for each square, depending on how many other geographers have already submitted geographs to that square. The relevant date is when the photo was submitted, rather than taken.

A contributor gains a TPoint (Time-gap Point) by submitting a photo that was taken over five years after the most recent image for that square. A contributor can also gain a TPoint by submitting an historic photo to a square that was taken at least five years distant from any other photograph in the square.

The site also provides a count of the number of grid squares each contributor has photographed (Personal Points).

Some of the common themes for geograph photos include:
 Physical landscape
 Human land use
 Built environment
 Social interaction
 Geology
 Flora and fauna
 Local history

Statistics

As of November 2021, the project had over 7 million photographs from over 13,300 contributors, covering over 98% of Great Britain and over 46% of Ireland. There were an average of 24.9 images per grid square.

Milestones include:
29 November 2021: The 7 millionth image was submitted
17 January 2019: The 6 millionth image was submitted
5 July 2016: The 5 millionth image was submitted
9 June 2014: The 4 millionth image was submitted
August 2012: 80% coverage of Great Britain & Ireland
29 June 2012: The 3 millionth image was submitted
14 August 2010: The 2 millionth image was submitted
15 October 2008: Millionth image
8 April 2008: 750,000 images
13 March 2008: Two-thirds coverage of Great Britain & Ireland
25 July 2007: 500,000 images
 25 June 2007: 75% coverage of Great Britain
 30 May 2007: 10% coverage of Ireland
 5 March 2007: 50% coverage of Great Britain & Ireland
 3 October 2006: 250,000 images
 17 August 2006: 50% coverage of Great Britain
 1 March 2006: 25% coverage of Great Britain & Ireland
 21 December 2005: 25% coverage of Great Britain

Photograph of the Year competition

A weekly competition runs in the members-only forums to select the Photograph of the Year (POTY) from photographs taken that week. Each week one of a panel of volunteer selectors chooses around 50 of the week's best photos. Last week's winner then picks their favourite photo from the 50. After the end of the year the weekly winners are voted on to decide the best photo of each month and overall winner.

The annual winners were;
2015 "Sunrise at Ross Back Sands" by  Ian Capper  
2014 "North end of Mochrum Loch" by David Baird  
2013 "Whiteout in Ninesprings" by Eugene Birchall 
2012 "A slipway on Luing" by Walter Baxter.
2011 "Morning Walk" by Mike Smith.
2010 "The north ridge of Stob Ban" by Karl and Ali
2009 "Miners Hill" by Ian Slater.
2008 "Deer Fence on the Shank of Drumfollow" by Gwen and James Anderson.
2007 "Horsey Drainage Mill" by Rodney Burton.
2006 "Islands of mud, East Hoyle Bank" by Peter Craine.

Awards
The Geograph site was awarded the Yahoo (UK & Ireland) Travel Find of the Year 2006.

UK Wikimedian of the Year 2012 – Honourable Mention

Geograph Conference

On 17 February 2010, Geograph British Isles organised its first conference for contributors to the project. About 80 contributors attended to discuss the project in both plenary and break-out sessions. The event was hosted by Geograph's sponsor, Ordnance Survey. It took place at the Ordnance Survey head office at Romsey near Southampton and was reported by geography-related media.

On 4 April 2012 a second conference took place at The Circle in Sheffield. It took stock of where the project was at that time, as it neared 3 million submissions; and put forward potential solutions that could secure its financial future in the years ahead.

The third conference took place at The Edinburgh Training and Conference Venue on Saturday 8 June 2013. Subjects discussed included funding of the project, educational use of the images and the moderation procedures applied to contributors' submissions.

For the fourth conference, the venue was again Southampton, the Ordnance Survey's new headquarters building at Adanac Park, on 27 June 2014. Subjects discussed included the quality of submitted photographs and titles, the production of high-quality descriptions, local studies, as well as the funding of the project, educational use of the images and the moderation procedures applied to contributors' submissions as in 2013.

For the fifth conference, Geograph members gathered at Peterborough. On the Friday afternoon conference attendees visited a brickworks just outside the city. The conference itself was held at Peterborough Museum and included a talk on the geologist William Smith. Walks around the city centre and local waterways concluded the proceedings.

Tools and facilities
The site has a number of tools for making use of the photographs.  Collectively known as Collections, the site front page now features a Collection of the week.  The various techniques include (with examples):
 Shared Descriptions, a simple method of grouping images by a common topic
 Articles, a longer text-and-image article by one or more authors
 Galleries, a forum-like mechanism where people list similar photos
 Geotrips, where photographs, a GPS track file, and a written description combine to illustrate a day out or an expedition.

Contributors can choose to add meta-data to each image, in the form of Subject and Tags, to go along with the geo-tagging by location.  All of this allows the use of a Browser to allow the relatively large archive to be searched.  There are other methods of search, of course, ranging from Simple text search to tagged searches and complex searches.

Because of the geographic indexing of the pictures, it is possible to summon a page for an individual 1-km square.  These square pages all provide a /link page which links to internal and external tools, such as a wide range of other mapping sites, and the various national historical artefacts databases.

The site has a lot of detailed statistics, but can also create personal profile and personal coverage maps.  It started as a game, and many of the tools support personal achievement and goals.

Long term archival 

The site's 5 million plus photographs were selected for long term web archiving by the British Library in their UK Web Archive.

Many photographs have been transferred to Wikimedia Commons, and the photos are used in thousands of Wikipedia articles.  About 1.8 million photos were transferred to Commons in 2010, but no further bulk transfers have been undertaken. However, tools and advice for transferring are provided for each photo on its re-use page.

Sister projects
In 2009, a sister project, Geograph Deutschland was launched, covering Germany. Geograph Ireland currently co-exists with Geograph Britain and Ireland, but may split into a separate project. Geograph Channel Islands covers the Channel Islands.

Mobile apps
There is an Android app named Geograph Alerts in the Google Play store which will track your current location and inform you if you enter a grid square which you have not yet photographed.

See also
 Degree Confluence Project

References

External links

 Geograph Deutschland

Geography of the United Kingdom
Geography of Ireland
Image-sharing websites
Photo archives in the United Kingdom
Outdoor locating games
British Isles
British digital libraries